Wild Cat Bluff is a ghost town in northwestern Anderson County, Texas, United States, and is a part of the Palestine, Texas micropolitan area.

History
Wild Cat Bluff was located where Wildcat Creek enters the Trinity River, and served as a ferry crossing and a shipping point for area farmers. Wild Cat Bluff thrived while the river served as a main form of transportation, but declined after the arrival of the railroads to the county in 1870. Some of the residents moved to the new community developing to the east.

See also
Jarvis, Texas

References

Wild Cat Bluff, Texas: Handbook of Texas Online, University of Texas at Austin

Ghost towns in East Texas